Jüri Ratas' cabinet was the 49th cabinet of Estonia, in office from 23 November 2016 to 29 April 2019. It was a centre-left coalition cabinet of Centre Party, Social Democratic Party and conservative Pro Patria and Res Publica Union. It was preceded by the Second Cabinet of Taavi Rõivas, a cabinet that ended when Social Democrats and the Union of Pro Patria and Res Publica joined the opposition's no confidence vote against the cabinet. This was the first time since 1999 the liberal centre-right Reform Party were out of the government.

Ministers 
Centre Party and Social Democratic Party announced the names of their chosen cabinet ministers on 19 November, whereas Pro Patria and Res Publica made the announcement on 21 November.

|-
! colspan=6 | Source

Resignations and changes 

On 6 December 2016, Minister of Rural Affairs, Martin Repinski, resigned due to massive media criticism of the questionable business practices of his goat farm. Centre Party decided to nominate Tarmo Tamm as his successor.

On 24 May 2017, Minister of Public Administration, Mihhail Korb, resigned, in the interests of the health of the coalition, after the scandal that erupted following his comment on his lack of support for Estonia's NATO membership. He was replaced with Jaak Aab. Aab himself resigned on 17 April 2018 after being caught by Police speeding (73 km/h in 50 km/h zone) and driving under the influence (blood alcohol level 0.28‰) and was replaced with Janek Mäggi, until then non-partisan public relations specialist.

On 7 June 2017, following the change of party leadership, Pro Patria and Res Publica Union, decided to replace three of it ministers in the Cabinet. 
Siim Kiisler replaced Marko Pomerants as Minister of the Environment.
Toomas Tõniste replaced Sven Sester as Minister of Finance.
Jüri Luik replaced Margus Tsahkna as Minister of Defence.

On 7 April 2018, Minister of Health and Labour, Jevgeni Ossinovski, announced his intention to resign in order to focus on leading the Social Democratic party to the March 2019 elections. He was replaced with Riina Sikkut.

On 23 July 2018, Minister of Entrepreneurship, Urve Palo, announced her resignation and that she had also quit Social Democratic Party. She was replaced with Rene Tammist.

On 20 November 2018, Minister of the Interior, Andres Anvelt, announced that he would resign and leave politics due to health reasons. He was replaced by Katri Raik on November 26.

References

External links
Official Website of Estonian Government

2016 establishments in Estonia
Cabinets of Estonia
Cabinets established in 2016
2019 disestablishments in Estonia
Cabinets disestablished in 2019